Wurmbea centralis is a species of plant in the Colchicaceae family that is endemic to Australia.

Description
The species is a cormous perennial herb that grows to a height of 4.5–20 cm. Its pink or purplish-pink flowers appear from May to August.

Distribution and habitat
The species is found in South Australia and the southern Northern Territory. It grows mainly in hilly areas among rocks.

References

centralis
Monocots of Australia
Flora of South Australia
Flora of the Northern Territory
Plants described in 1980
Taxa named by Terry Desmond Macfarlane